Fairy stone may refer to:

 The mineral staurolite 
 Certain calcium carbonate concretions in clay
Fairy Stone State Park in Patrick County, Virginia